Eric Elfman is an American writer interested in science fiction, fantasy, UFOs and paranormal events. He is the author of 13 books for middle-grade and young adult readers, including the Accelerati Trilogy, which he co-wrote with Neal Shusterman. Among Elfman's other books are Almanac of Alien Encounters (Random House, 2001), Almanac of the Gross, Disgusting, and Totally Repulsive (Random House, 1994, an ALA Recommended Book for Reluctant Readers), and Very Scary Almanac (Random House, 1993).

Elfman has been on the faculty of the Big Sur Children’s Writers Workshop, sponsored by the Henry Miller Memorial Library and directed by Andrea Brown. He has also presented writing advice at the Ventana Sierra Advanced Writing Workshop in Carson City, Nevada, directed by author Ellen Hopkins.

As a private writing coach, Elfman has worked with the New York Times bestselling author Veronica Rossi (Under the Never Sky), the award-winning author Meg Medina (Yaqui Delgado), Barry Wolverton (Neversink) and Stacey Lee (Under a Painted Sky, 2015), and many other writers.

Bibliography
Series
Accelerati Trilogy (with Neal Shusterman)
Tesla's Attic (2014) 
Edison's Alley (2015) 
Hawking's Hallway (2016) 
Novels
Noah's Ark (1999) 
Collections
Three-minute Thrillers (1994) 
More Three-minute Thrillers (1995) 
Super Three-minute Thrillers (1996) 
Series contributed to
Our town: a novelization (X Files) (1997) 
Non fiction
The Very Scary Almanac (1993) 
Almanac of the Gross, Disgusting & Totally Repulsive (1994) 
Almanac of Alien Encounters (2001) 
Beyond Genius: The 12 Essential Traits of Today's Renaissance Men (with Scott Griffiths; 2012)

References 

American children's writers
Living people
Year of birth missing (living people)